Total Badass is a 2010 documentary by American director and producer Bob Ray that first premiered on May 19, 2010. Forgoing the usual route of signing a deal with a film distributor, the film will instead be showcased at different venues around the United States, along with some of the filmmaker's other independent films; such as the 2007's documentary Hell on Wheels.

Critical review
Total Badass has received generally positive reviews.  Despite many scenes of explicit behavior by its subject, it is considered an admirable movie of "life on the artistic and social fringe, and a thriller."

Cast
 Chad Holt

References

External links
 
 

2010 films
American documentary films
2010 documentary films
2010s English-language films
2010s American films